Henry Peck may refer to:

Henry "Hennery" Peck, fictional character commonly known as Peck's Bad Boy
Henry Peck (MP) for Chichester (UK Parliament constituency)
Henry W. Peck of 2nd Wisconsin Volunteer Infantry Regiment
Henry M. Peck House

See also
Harry Peck, American classical scholar, author, editor, and critic